James Madison Broom (1776 – January 15, 1850) was an American lawyer and politician from Wilmington, in New Castle County, Delaware. He was a member of the Federalist Party, who served as a U. S. Representative from Delaware.

Early life and family
Broom was born in Wilmington, Delaware, the son of Delaware politician Jacob Broom and Rachel Pierce. James was born near Wilmington, Delaware. His first wife's name was Ann who died August 9, 1808, and he may have remarried Mary Lowber. By his first wife he has two children, Elizabeth and Jacob, a Congressman from Pennsylvania. James Broom graduated from Princeton College in 1794. He then studied law, was admitted to the Delaware Bar in 1801 and practiced law in New Castle, Wilmington, and Baltimore, Maryland.

Professional and political career
Broom was elected as a Federalist in the 9th and 10th Congresses, serving from March 4, 1805, until his resignation 1807, before the assembling of the 10th Congress.  He moved to Philadelphia, Pennsylvania in 1819 and resumed the practice of law. Later he was a member of the Pennsylvania House of Representatives in 1824.

Death and legacy
He died in Philadelphia on January 15, 1850, and was buried in St. Mary’s Churchyard in Hamilton Village, now a part of Philadelphia, Pennsylvania.

Almanac
Elections were held the first Tuesday of October. U.S. Representatives took office March 4 and have a two-year term.

Notes

References
Biographical Directory of the U.S. Congress 
Delaware's Members of Congress
Find a Grave
 The Political Graveyard

Places with more information
Delaware Historical Society; website; 505 North Market Street, Wilmington, Delaware 19801; (302) 655-7161
University of Delaware; Library website; 181 South College Avenue, Newark, Delaware 19717; (302) 831-2965

1776 births
1850 deaths
People from Wilmington, Delaware
Politicians from Philadelphia
Princeton University alumni
Delaware lawyers
Pennsylvania lawyers
Members of the Pennsylvania House of Representatives
Burials in Pennsylvania
Federalist Party members of the United States House of Representatives from Delaware
People from Newport, Delaware
19th-century American lawyers